Abyssocottus gibbosus is a species of ray-finned fish belonging to the family Cottidae, the typical sculpins. These sculpins are endemic to Lake Baikal in Russia. It dwells at a depth range of 400–1600 metres. Males can reach a maximum total length of 14 centimetres.

References

gibbosus
Fish described in 1906
Fish of Lake Baikal
Taxa named by Lev Berg